The William and Elizabeth McLaren House, at 1602 15th Ave. in Lewiston, Idaho, was built in 1904.  It was designed by Lewiston architect James Nave.  It was listed on the National Register of Historic Places in 1992.

It is Colonial Revival in style.

The similar James Asposas House, at 1610 Fifteenth Ave., was listed on the National Register in 1994.

References

		
National Register of Historic Places in Nez Perce County, Idaho
Colonial Revival architecture in Idaho
Houses completed in 1904